The Britannia Mine Museum, formerly British Columbia Museum of Mining, is a nonprofit organization in Britannia Beach, 55 km kilometres north of Vancouver, British Columbia, Canada, on the Sea-to-Sky Highway on Howe Sound. It is governed by the Britannia Beach Historical Society. The museum preserves and presents to the public information and artifacts related to British Columbia's mining industry.

National historic site 

The museum is the site of Mill 3, also called the Concentrator.  This 20 storey building, a gravity fed concentrator for ore processing, was designated as a National Historic Site of Canada in 1987 (with a ceremony in 1988).  The Britannia Mine was an important source of copper ore for almost 70 years and during the 1920s and 1930s it constituted one of the largest mining operations in Canada.  The gravity-fed concentrator was highly innovative, as, for example, in the use of bulk froth flotation.

History 

The Britannia Beach Historical Society was established in 1971 as part of BC's centennial plans.  Its goal was to preserve the history of mining activities in British Columbia.  The museum opened in 1975 as the BC Museum of Mining. Mill 3 underwent a $5 million exterior rehabilitation between 2005 and 2007 to replace the siding, roof, and windows.

After an additional $14.7 million redevelopment project, the museum was renamed the Britannia Mine Museum in October 2010.  There are displays concerning the importance of minerals in daily life, and on the history of the Britannia Mine, including its environmental remediation.  The funding for this, the Britannia Project, came from government, industry donors and individuals.

Buildings and site 

The museum oversees 23 historic industrial, administrative and domestic buildings, over 7000 artifacts, 9500 archive photos and 3000 archival documents and maps.  Visitors are given a train ride through an historic haulage tunnel, driven in 1914 to transport ore from the original mill buildings to the shore.  Historic mining and lighting equipment is demonstrated to the visitor.  The historic nature of the site has resulted in many feature films and TV productions being filmed there, most notably Scooby-Doo 2: Monsters Unleashed, the episode "Paper Clip" of The X-Files, Okja., The Man in the High Castle (TV series) and MacGyver

References

External links

Official Web site
Britannia Mine Museum at Mining Association of British Columbia

Mining museums in Canada
Museums in British Columbia
National Historic Sites in British Columbia